Queeny-Aimée Magdalena Rajkowski (born 17 November 1988) is a Dutch politician, who has served as a member of the House of Representatives since the 2021 general election. There, she represents the People's Party for Freedom and Democracy (VVD). She was also on the Utrecht municipal council in the years 2014–21.

Early life and education 
Rajkowski was born in 1988 in the Gelderland city Nijmegen to a Polish father, who was a teacher and an entrepreneur, and a mother, who was half Dutch and half Polish and worked as a manager for the province of Gelderland. She has a younger sister and grew up in the city Arnhem, where she attended the high school Stedelijk Gymnasium Arnhem. Rajkoswki moved to Utrecht to study economics at university and was a member of the student association Unitas. She switched to public administration at Leiden University after a year, and she became a member of the Youth Organisation Freedom and Democracy (JOVD), the VVD's independent youth division.

Career 
Rajkowski was elected to the Utrecht municipal council in the 2014 municipal elections, appearing fifth on the VVD's party list. She became her party's spokesperson for safety in the council. At the time, she had also been working for the government of the municipality of Utrecht since 2013. Thereafter, she filled positions related to education at Orion Duurzaam Leren and eFcous before moving in 2016 to Valtech, where she would later serve as head of learning and development. As a councilor, Rajkowski criticized the decision by SPO, which is responsible for Utrecht's public primary schools, to stop using  in its  celebrations, saying parents had not been properly consulted. Besides, she advocated closing Utrecht's street prostitution zone in favor of window prostitution.

She was placed second on the  party list in the 2018 municipal election in Utrecht and was re-elected to the council. She became the VVD's vice caucus leader in the council, while safety, jobs, and income were among her specializations. When the commemoration of the 2019 Utrecht tram shooting was canceled in 2020 due to the COVID-19 pandemic, Rajkowski called on Utrecht's citizens to observe one minute of silence and to light a candle.

She ran for member of parliament in the 2021 general election as the VVD's thirteenth candidate and was elected with 3,246 preference votes. She was installed as House member on 31 March and became the first person on that body of Polish descent. Rajkowski had already left Utrecht's municipal council in February, and she also left Valtech. In the House, she is the VVD's spokesperson for digitization, government IT, telecommunications, the General Intelligence and Security Service, and cybersecurity. Rajkowski is on the Committees for Digital Affairs, for Economic Affairs and Climate Policy, for the Interior, and for Justice and Security. She called for Russian hackers to be put on the European sanction list during the 2022 Russian invasion of Ukraine. Rajkowski also proposed a ban on deepfake technology out of concern for its usage for revenge porn and political hoaxes. She raised the possibility of an exception for businesses using the technology for legitimate usages. A motion by Rajkowski requesting the cabinet to draft such a bill passed the House of Representatives in November 2022.

Personal life 
Rajkowski lives in the city of Utrecht, and she got married in 2022. In early 2023, she was a contestant of the KRO-NCRV quiz show , surviving four episodes. The first of those was seen by over 2.5 million people.

References

External links 
 Personal website 
 Queeny Rajkowski, Houseofrepresentatives.nl

1988 births
Living people
21st-century Dutch politicians
21st-century Dutch women politicians
Dutch people of Polish descent
Leiden University alumni
Members of the House of Representatives (Netherlands)
Municipal councillors of Utrecht (city)
People's Party for Freedom and Democracy politicians